Mugalu may refer to:
Mugalu, alternative name for Yujiulü Mugulü, 4th century Rouran leader
Stephen Kaziimba Mugalu (born 1962), Ugandan Anglican bishop

See also
Mughal (disambiguation)